Vergennes Township may refer to the following places:

 Vergennes Township, Jackson County, Illinois
 Vergennes Township, Kent County, Michigan

See also

Vergennes (disambiguation)

Township name disambiguation pages